7th AFCA Awards

Best Film: 
Hugo

The 7th Austin Film Critics Association Awards, honoring the best in filmmaking for 2011, were announced on December 28, 2011.

Top 10 Films
 Hugo
 Drive
 Take Shelter
 Midnight in Paris
 Attack the Block
 The Artist
 Martha Marcy May Marlene
 I Saw the Devil (Akmareul boatda)
 13 Assassins
 Melancholia

Winners
 Best Film:
 Hugo
 Best Director:
 Nicolas Winding Refn – Drive
 Best Actor:
 Michael Shannon – Take Shelter
 Best Actress:
 Tilda Swinton – We Need to Talk About Kevin
 Best Supporting Actor:
 Albert Brooks – Drive
 Best Supporting Actress:
 Jessica Chastain – Take Shelter
 Best Original Screenplay:
 Midnight in Paris – Woody Allen
 Best Adapted Screenplay:
 Drive – Hossein Amini
 Best Cinematography:
 The Tree of Life – Emmanuel Lubezki
 Best Original Score:
 Attack the Block – Steven Price
 Best Foreign Language Film:
 I Saw the Devil (Akmareul boatda) • South Korea
 Best Documentary:
 Senna
 Best Animated Feature:
 Rango
 Best First Film:
 Joe Cornish – Attack the Block
 Bobby McCurdy Breakthrough Artist Award:
 Jessica Chastain – Coriolanus, The Debt, The Help, Take Shelter, Texas Killing Fields, and The Tree of Life
 Austin Film Award:
 Take Shelter – Jeff Nichols

References

External links
 
 

2011 film awards
2011